Hideaway or Hide Away may refer to:

Film
 Hideaway (1937 film), an American comedy film
 Hideaway (1995 film), an American horror film by Brett Leonard
 Hideaway (2009 film) or The Refuge, a French film by François Ozon
 Hide Away (film), a 2011 American film by Chris Eyre

Music
 Hideaway (jazz club), a jazz venue in south London

Albums
 Hideaway (America album) (1976)
 Hideaway (David Sanborn album) (1980)
 Hideaway (The Weepies album) (2008)
 Hideaway (Wavves album) (2021)
 Hideaway, a 1986 album by Stanley Clarke
 Hideaway, a 2012 album by Matt Bianco

Songs
 "Hide Away" (instrumental), a 1960 composition by Freddie King; covered by Eric Clapton, Stevie Ray Vaughan, and other artists
 "Hideaway" (Tessanne Chin song) (2006)
 "Hideaway" (Cockney Rebel song) (1974)
 "Hide Away" (Daya song) (2015)
 "Hideaway" (De'Lacy song) (1995)
 "Hideaway" (Delays song) (2006)
 "Hideaway" (Kiesza song) (2014)
 "Hideaway" (Dave Dee, Dozy, Beaky, Mick & Tich song) (1966)
 "Hideaway", a 1986 song by Berlin from Count Three & Pray
 "(Wish I Could) Hideaway", a 1970 song by Creedence Clearwater Revival from Pendulum
 "Hide Away", a 2004 song by Hilary Duff from Hilary Duff
 "Hideaway", a 1987 song by Erasure from The Circus
 "Hideaway", a 1998 song by Fuel from Sunburn
 "Hideaway", a 2000 song by Ivy from Long Distance
 "Hideaway", a 2016 song by Jacob Collier from In My Room
 "Hideaway", a 2017 song by Queens of the Stone Age from Villains
 "Hideaway", a 2005 song by Barbra Streisand from Guilty Pleasures

Other uses
 Hideaway, Texas
 Hideaway (novel), a 1992 novel by Dean Koontz
 Hideaway (U.S. Senate), secret offices used by members of the United States Senate

See also
 The Hideaways (disambiguation)